Stadion Zlatica is a football stadium in Zlatica, a suburb of Podgorica Capital, Montenegro. It is used for football matches and is the home ground of FK Kom.

History
The current stadium in Zlatica was built in 2016. 
 It is situated near the old field, which was demolished during 2015.
The new football stadium in Zlatica has a capacity of 1,200 seats. With numerous facilities and another training pitch, the stadium meets the criteria for official games in every national competition.

Old ground
Previously, in period between 1958 and 2015, FK Kom played home games at an old field, near the new stadium. The old stadium had a capacity of 800 seats.

Pitch and conditions
The pitch measures 110 x 70 meters. The stadium didn't met UEFA criteria for European competitions, but meets all criteria for official games in all national competitions.
In addition to the main field is an auxiliary field with artificial grass that is used for competitions in the youth categories.

See also
FK Kom
Podgorica

References 

Football venues in Montenegro
Football in Montenegro
FK Kom
Sport in Podgorica
Buildings and structures in Podgorica